The mixed team event at the 2018 Summer Youth Olympics was held at the Africa Pavilion on 10 October.

Seeding

Results

Final classification

References

External links
Seeding 
Results 

Fencing at the 2018 Summer Youth Olympics